This is a list of the Serbia national football team results from 2020 to present.

Fixtures and results

2020

2021

2022

2023

See also
Serbia national football team results
Serbia national football team results (2006–09)
Serbia national football team results (2010–19)

Notes

References

External links

Serbia national football team results
2020s in Serbia